João Câmara is a municipality in the state of Rio Grande do Norte, Brazil.  The municipality was founded on 29 October 1928.

João Câmara borders eight municipalities, three of which are Touros to the northeast, Pureza to the east and Parazinho to the north.

References 

Populated places established in 1928
Municipalities in Rio Grande do Norte